Poreyahat Assembly constituency   is an assembly constituency in the Indian state of Jharkhand.

Overview
Poreyahat Assembly constituency covers: Poreyahat Police Station in Godda district, Sarayiahat Police Station in Dumka district and Burhikura, Dammajhilua, Sandmara, Nonbatta, Makhni, Pathra and Punsiya gram panchayats of Godda Police Station in Godda district.

Poreyahat Assembly constituency is part of Godda (Lok Sabha constituency).

Members of Legislative Assembly

See also
Poraiyahat
Godda (community development block)
Saraiyahat

References

Assembly constituencies of Jharkhand
Godda district